The Martinů Quartet is a Czech string quartet ensemble founded in 1976, originally under the name Havlák Quartet by students of Professor Viktor Moučka at the Prague Conservatory. In 1985, with the approval of the Bohuslav Martinů Foundation, the quartet assumed its present name Martinů Quartet, pledging to promote the chamber music of Czech composer Bohuslav Martinů. The quartet specialises in the works of Czech composers such as Smetana, Dvořák and Janáček, and especially the works of Bohuslav Martinů. They perform regularly at the Prague Spring Festival as well as concerts in many European Countries, the United States, Canada and Japan. The quartet also teaches chamber music performance at two annual chamber music workshops in the Czech Republic, which are open to both amateur and professional musicians.

Members
Lubomír Havlák, first violin
Adéla Štajnochrová, second violin
Zbyněk Paďourek, viola
Jitka Vlašánková, violoncello

Awards
The Martinů Quartet took part in eight international chamber music competitions and won awards at each event, most notably at the Prague Spring Festival and the competitions held in Evian, Florence, Munich (ARD) and Portsmouth. In 2001, the quartet was awarded the Bohuslav Martinů Price by the Bohuslav Martinů Foundation in recognition of the quartet's achievement promoting the chamber music of Bohuslav Martinů. In 2003, the quartet's recording of Sylvie Bodorová's Terezín Ghetto Requiem received the Music Web UK's Recording of the month award. In 2004, the quartet received the celebrated MIDEM award in Cannes for the best CD of the year in the category solo and ensemble repertoire of the 20th century.

Recordings
The Martinů Quartet has released more than 20 CDs on major classical music labels, most notably on Naxos, but also Arcos Diva, Harmonia Mundi and others. In addition to recordings for release on CD, they have also recorded for radio broadcasts by Czech Radio, Radio France, BBC, ARD and ORF.

The quartet's most highly acclaimed CD releases are
 The complete string quartets by Bohuslav Martinů, released in 3 volumes on Naxos
 Vol.1, string quartets Tri jezdci, #1 and #2 in 1995, #8.553782, Review on Classics Today
 Vol.2, string quartets #3 and #6 in 1996, #8.553783, Review on Classics Today
 Vol.3, string quartets #4, #5 and #7 in 1997, #8.553784, Review on Classics Today
 Terezín Ghetto Requiem by Sylvie Bodorová and string quartet by Ronald Stevenson, released on Arco Diva in 2003, #UP 0052-2 131
 Piano quintets and violin sonatas by Bohuslav Martinů, released on Naxos in 2007, #8.557861, Review on Classics Today

Publications
The Martinů Quartet has been featured in multiple non-trivial published works in reliable and reputable media such as the Czech online musical encyclopedia published by the music faculty of Masaryk University of Brno, the Grove musical encyclopedia published by Oxford University, The New York Times, Classic Today magazine, Music Web UK and others.

External links
 Martinů Quartet website
 PLAYWIP chamber music workshop

Sources
 Kvarteto Martinů entry in the musical encyclopedia published by the Music Faculty of Masaryk University in Brno
 Grove musical encyclopedia published by Oxford University (access to online version restricted to paying subscribers)
 Classics Today, MIDEM 2004 Award winners
 Music Web UK, Recording of the month, November 2003
 Article in The New Yorker, February 24, 2003
 Article by Michael Beckerman in The New York Times, June 15, 2003
 Article by Tim Ashley in The Guardian, May 11, 2007
 Article by Carl Bauman, American Record Guide, September/October 2000
 Articles by Jan Smaczny, BBC Music Magazine, October 2000 and February 2003
 Article by Bob McQuiston, Classical Lost and Found, April 2007
 Archives of the Academy of Performing Arts in Prague (AMU)
 Archives of the Bohuslav Martinů Foundation in Prague and Basel
 Archives of the Prague Spring International Music Festival
 Archives of the ARD broadcasting corporation
 Kvarteto Martinů entry at Žižkov's music festival website
 Under the Linden Festival website
 Martinů Quartet profile
 Naxos artists profile

Czech string quartets
Musical groups established in 1976
1976 establishments in Czechoslovakia